Bristol and Norfolk is a district of the Massachusetts Senate. It covers 17.0% of Bristol County and 9.5% of Norfolk County population in 2010. Democrat Paul Feeney of Foxborough has represented the district since 2017.

Towns represented
The district includes the following localities:
 Attleboro
 Foxborough
 Mansfield
 Medfield
 Norton
 Rehoboth
 Seekonk
 Sharon
 Walpole

The current district geographic boundary overlaps with those of the Massachusetts House of Representatives' 1st Bristol, 2nd Bristol, 4th Bristol, 14th Bristol, 8th Norfolk, 9th Norfolk, 11th Norfolk, 12th Norfolk, and 13th Norfolk districts.

List of senators

See also
 Bristol County districts of the Massachusetts House of Representatives: 1st, 2nd, 3rd, 4th, 5th, 6th, 7th, 8th, 9th, 10th, 11th, 12th, 13th, 14th
 Norfolk County districts of the Massachusetts House of Representatives: 1st, 2nd, 3rd, 4th, 5th, 6th, 7th, 8th, 9th, 10th, 11th, 12th, 13th, 14th, 15th

References

External links
  (State Senate district information based on U.S. Census Bureau's American Community Survey).
 
 League of Women Voters of Sharon-Stoughton

Senate Bristol and Norfolk
Government of Bristol County, Massachusetts
Government of Norfolk County, Massachusetts
Massachusetts Senate